is the third single by Japanese singer Yōko Oginome. Written by Yoshiko Miura and Daisuke Inoue, the single was released on November 5, 1984 by Victor Entertainment.

Background and release
The song was used as an image song for Kao Corporation's Biore U skincare line. At the time of the song's release, actor Tsurutaro Kataoka gave Oginome her nickname .

"December Memory" peaked at No. 39 on Oricon's singles chart and sold over 20,000 copies.

Track listing
All lyrics are written by Yoshiko Miura; all music is composed by Daisuke Inoue; all music is arranged by Motoki Funayama.

Charts

References

External links

1984 singles
Yōko Oginome songs
Japanese-language songs
Victor Entertainment singles